Battle for Graxia was a free-to-play multiplayer online battle arena game developed by Petroglyph Games for Microsoft Windows. The game went open beta on Steam on November 28, 2012 in substitution of its predecessor Rise of Immortals.  The game shut down on June 27, 2013.

Features
Battle for Graxia features a social hub where players can show off their enhanced Immortals, chat, emote, browse leaderboards, shop, manage friend and guild lists and more. Players also have the option of taking their Immortals through cooperative Player versus Environment (PvE) scenarios to learn the game, try out new abilities and earn persistent experience before jumping into Player versus Player (PvP) matches online.

References

External links
 

Fantasy video games
Free-to-play video games
Multiplayer online battle arena games
Multiplayer video games
Video games scored by Frank Klepacki
Video games developed in the United States
Windows games
Windows-only games
Petroglyph Games games